Nagan Dam, is an earthfill dam on Nagan river near Navapur, Nandurbar district in the state of Maharashtra in India.

Specifications
It is built by Unity Multicons Pvt Ltd Solapur

Purpose
 Irrigation

See also
 Dams in Maharashtra
 List of reservoirs and dams in India

References

Dams in Nandurbar district
Year of establishment missing